Josh Thiel (born 2 June 1997) is a Canadian professional rugby union player for San Diego Legion in Major League Rugby and for BC Bears in the Canadian Rugby Championship. Josh won his first cap for Canada in the 2018 Americas Rugby Championship vs Chile and has played for the Canada Sevens. Josh is the son of former professional player and Canadian international Jon Thiel and Canadian international Jen Ross

Club statistics

References

1991 births
Living people
BC Bears players
Canadian rugby sevens players
Canadian rugby union players
Pan American Games medalists in rugby sevens
Pan American Games silver medalists for Canada
Rugby sevens players at the 2019 Pan American Games
San Diego Legion players
Medalists at the 2019 Pan American Games
Rugby union fly-halves
Rugby union centres
Canada international rugby union players